UMB may refer to:

Universities
 University of Manitoba, a university in Winnipeg, Manitoba, Canada
 Marc Bloch University, also known as Université Marc Bloch (UMB), a university in France
 Norwegian University of Life Sciences (NMBU), a university in Norway, previously known as Universitetet for miljø- og biovitenskap (UMB)
 University of Maryland, Baltimore, a university in Baltimore, Maryland, United States
 University of Massachusetts Boston, a university in Boston, Massachusetts, United States
 Manuela Beltrán University, a university in Bogotá, Colombia
 Matej Bel University (Univerzita Mateja Bela) a public university in Banská Bystrica, Slovakia
 Mercu Buana University, Jakarta, Indonesia

Other
 UMB Financial Corporation, a bank and financial services company in Kansas City, USA
 Upper memory block, a segment of RAM in PCs
 Ultra Mobile Broadband, a one-time proposal for a CDMA-based 4G mobile standard
 Ultrasound in Medicine and Biology, a scholarly journal
 Union Mondiale de Billard, a governing body for carom billiards
 Umberleigh railway station, Devon, England, whose code is UMB
 Umbundu, a language of Angola (code: umb)
 Unreinforced masonry building, a type of building